Robert Daniel "Danny" Nightingale (born 21 May 1954) is a British modern pentathlete and Olympic champion.

He won a team gold medal in the modern pentathlon at the 1976 Summer Olympics in Montreal, with Adrian Parker and Jim Fox.

Nightingale was the British pentathlon champion in 1976, 1977, and 1978. He later became the Development Officer for the Modern Pentathlon Association.

Nightingale used to work as a PE teacher at Rye Hills secondary school.

References

External links

1954 births
Living people
British male modern pentathletes
Olympic modern pentathletes of Great Britain
Modern pentathletes at the 1976 Summer Olympics
Modern pentathletes at the 1980 Summer Olympics
English Olympic medallists
Olympic gold medallists for Great Britain
Olympic medalists in modern pentathlon
Medalists at the 1976 Summer Olympics